Blue Onion (German: Zwiebelmuster) is a porcelain tableware pattern for dishware originally manufactured by Meissen porcelain since the 18th century, and since the last 19th Century has been copied by other companies.

History
The "onion" pattern was originally named the "bulb" pattern.

While modelled after a pattern first produced by Chinese porcelain painters, which featured pomegranates unfamiliar in Saxony, the plates and bowls produced in the Meissen factory in 1740 produced their own style and feel. Among the earliest Chinese examples are underglaze blue and white porcelains of the early Ming Dynasty. The Meissen painters created hybrids that resembled flora more familiar to Europeans. The so-called "onions" are not onions at all, but, according to historians, are most likely mutations of the peaches and pomegranates modelled on the original Chinese pattern. The design is a grouping of several floral motifs, with peonies and asters in the pattern's centre, and winding stems around a bamboo stalk.

Before the end of the 18th century, other porcelain factories were copying the Meissen Zwiebelmuster. In the 19th century almost all the European manufactories offered a version, with transfer-printed outlines that were coloured in by hand. Enoch Wedgwood's pattern in the 1870s was known as "Meissen". Today, a Japanese version called "Blue Danube" is well-known and featured amongst tableware patterns.

Characteristics 
While the design is considered to have originated from an east Asian model, likely Chinese, it also demonstrates the European influence within the abstract stylisation.  It is connected with the rhythm and rules of rococo ornamentation: for instance, the asymmetrical motif is composed according to type in various areas, giving the impression of symmetry.  

The onion pattern was designed as a white ware decorated with cobalt blue underglaze pattern.  Some rare dishes have a green, red, pink, or black pattern instead of the cobalt blue. A very rare type is called red bud because there are red accents on the blue-and-white dishes.

References

External links 

Zwiebelmuster aus Dubi Czech
Homepage Meissen Porcelain
A Brief History of Meissen Dinnerware

Porcelain
German porcelain
Meissen porcelain
Individual patterns of tableware